Durmuşköy is a village in the Karakoçan District of Elazığ Province in Turkey. Its population is 329 (2021). The village is populated by Kurds and Zazas.

References

Villages in Karakoçan District
Kurdish settlements in Elazığ Province